Simone Marino (born 8 December 1996) is an Italian karateka. He won the silver medal in the men's +84 kg event at the 2021 World Karate Championships held in Dubai, United Arab Emirates. In 2017, he won the gold medal in the men's +84 kg event at the European Karate Championships held in İzmit, Turkey.

At the 2018 Mediterranean Games held in Tarragona, Spain, he competed in the men's kumite +84 kg event.

References

External links 
 

Living people
1996 births
Place of birth missing (living people)
Italian male karateka
Competitors at the 2018 Mediterranean Games
Mediterranean Games competitors for Italy
20th-century Italian people
21st-century Italian people